David Upson (born 14 March 1962) is a British sprint canoer who competed in the mid-1980s. He finished fifth in the K-1 500 m event at the 1984 Summer Olympics in Los Angeles.

References

Sports-Reference.com profile

1962 births
Canoeists at the 1984 Summer Olympics
Living people
Olympic canoeists of Great Britain
British male canoeists